Tamil Nadu is the second largest state economy in India. It is also the most industrialised state in the country. More than 60% of the state is urbanized, accounting over 10.6% of the urban population in the country which is 6% of India's total population. Services contributes to 55% of the economic activity in the state, followed by manufacturing at 34% and agriculture at 11%. Government is the major investor in the state, with 52% of total investments, followed by private Indian investors at 29.9% and foreign private investors at 14.9%.  It has been ranked as the most economically free state in India by the Economic Freedom Rankings for the States of India.

Macroeconomic trend

Socialist Boom
Real GSDP per capita grew 96 per cent during 1980-95.

Capitalist Boom
Real GSDP per capita grew 188 per cent during 1995-2014.

Economic Bust
Real GSDP per capita grew 35 per cent during 2014-21.

Sectors

Agriculture and livestock

Tamil Nadu has historically been an agricultural state, while its advances in other fields transformed the state into being an industrialized and innovation based economy, leading to competition for land and its resources. Agriculture is heavily dependent on the river water and monsoon rains. The perennial rivers are Palar, Cheyyar, Ponnaiyar, Kaveri, Meyar, Bhavani, Amaravathi, Vaigai, Chittar and Tamaraparani. Non-perennial rivers include the Vellar, Noyyal, Suruli, Siruvani, Gundar, Vaipar, Valparai and Varshali. Tamil Nadu is the highest producer of bananas and coconuts in the whole country. It is also a leading state in production of other crops such as sugarcane, cotton, kambu, maize, rye, groundnut and oil seeds. At present, Tamil Nadu is India's 4th largest producer of rice behind West Bengal, Uttar Pradesh and Punjab Tamil Nadu is the home to Dr. M. S. Swaminathan, known as the "father of the Green Revolution" in India. The state is one of the major producers of turmeric in India.

Given below is a table of 2015–16 national output share of select agricultural crops and allied segments in Tamil Nadu based on 2011 prices

Mining
This is a chart of proven reserves of major minerals of Tamil Nadu by Department of Geology and Mining with figures in tonnes.

Tamil Nadu has a few mining projects based on Titanium, Lignite, Magnesite, Graphite, Limestone, Granite and Bauxite. The first one is the Neyveli Lignite Corporation that has led development of large industrial complex around Neyveli in Cuddalore district with Thermal power plants, Fertilizer, Brequetting and Carbonisation plants. Tata Iron and Steel Company (TISCO) have entered into MoU with Government of Tamil Nadu in June 2002 for establishing a titanium dioxide (TiO2) plant with a project outlay of $650 million. Magnesite mining is done at Salem apart from which mining of Bauxite ores are carried out at Yercaud and this region is also rich in Iron Ore Kanjamalai. Molybdenum is found in Dharmapuri, and is the only source in the country.

Energy
Tamil Nadu, being an industrialized and urbanized state, is among the top 3 states with respect to generation of electricity. The total installed capacity of Tamil Nadu stands at around 30200 MW as in September 2018, that derives 11500 MW of power from solar and wind energy. Tamil Nadu has the distinction of being the leader in renewable energy in India by adopting clean sources of energy and having established wind farms as early as 1995. Today it produces more wind power than Denmark and the Netherlands.

Wind energy
The Tamil Nadu Energy Development Agency (TEDA) is a Tamil Nadu government promoting renewable energy sources and energy conservation activities. The agency has largely been responsible for instigating the tremendous growth of Tamil Nadu in the development of wind power. The total installed capacity of windmills in Tamil Nadu totals to around 8700MW. Muppandal wind farm is a renewable energy source, supplying the villagers with electricity for work. Wind farms were built in Nagercoil and Tuticorin apart from already existing ones around Coimbatore, Pollachi, Dharapuram, Kangeyam and Udumalaipettai.

Solar

In March 2008, Signet Solar Inc. signed a memorandum of understanding with the State government to build a INR 20 billion thin-film silicon photovoltaic module manufacturing plant in the Sriperumbudur Special Economic Zone.
In June 2008, Moser Baer inked a MoU with the state government to build INR 20 billion plant for manufacturing of silicon-based photovoltaic thin film modules and allied products in the Oragadam Special Economic Zone which is closer to the Signet Solar's plant in sriperumbudur.

Nuclear

The Kalpakkam Nuclear Power Plant, Ennore Thermal Plant, Neyveli Lignite Power Plant, Virudhachalam Ceramics and the Narimanam Natural Gas Plants are major sources of Tamil Nadu's electricity. It is presently adding the Koodankulam Nuclear Power Plant to its energy grid. Tamil Nadu sources some of its power needs from renewable sources with wind power contributing over 2000 MW or over 20% of the needs. Tamil Nadu is facing largest power shortage since 2009 (34.1% deficit), the highest in the country, due to industrialization over the last decade. India's leading steel producer SAIL has a steel plant in Salem, Tamil Nadu. Tamil Nadu ranks first nationwide in diesel-based thermal electricity generation with national market share of over 34%.

Hydroelectric

The Mettur Dam is one of the largest dams in India. It was completed in 1936. The total length of the dam is 1700 meters. It is also called Stanley Reservoir. The Mettur Hydro Electrical power project is also quite large Mettur Dam. Mettur has a number of industries (50 km from Salem city): SISCOL, MALCO (Madras Aluminium Company owned by Vedanta Resources), Chemplast (former known as Mettur Chemicals), Thermal power plant, Hydel power plant and huge number of chemical industries. There are many other dams that provide irrigation and drinking water, including the Vaigai Dam.

Bio-diesel

Tamil Nadu at this time is the only state to have a formal Bio-Diesel Policy to use jatropha crops as a source of biofuel and to distribute wasteland to the poor farmers for the planting of these crops.

Industry and manufacturing
One of the global electrical equipment public sector company BHEL has manufacturing plants at Tiruchirappalli and Ranipet. The Tamil Nadu state government owns the Tamil Nadu Newsprint and Papers (TNPL), the world's biggest bagasse-based paper mills in Karur and Tiruchirappalli . The world's sixth largest manufacturer of watches together with TATA, under the brand name of "Titan" which has manufacturing plant in Hosur. 40 percent of all wind-generated electricity in India is created by windmills in Tamil Nadu. Danish wind power company NEG Micon has established its manufacturing unit in Chennai.
Tamil Nadu is a leading producer of cement in India and with manufacturing units located at Ariyalur, Coimbatore, Karur and Tirunelveli. High-density Polyethylene mono filament yarn and associated products are manufactured in Karur for mosquito nets and fishing nets. More than 60% mosquito nets in India are manufactured here. The region around Salem is rich in mineral ores. The country's largest steel public sector undertaking, SAIL, has a steel plant in Salem.

Coimbatore is a major industrial hub in South India and houses more than 30,000 small, medium and large industries. Coimbatore is known as "Manchester of South India" due to its extensive textile industry and also referred to as "the Pump City" as it supplies half or 50% of India's requirements of motors and pumps. The city is one of the largest exporters of textile, jewellery, wet grinders, poultry and auto components and the term "Coimbatore Wet Grinder" has been given a Geographical indication. Larsen & Toubro has 300 acre huge manufacturing campus in Coimbatore which houses various units of company, manufactures aerospace and defence parts for leading players in the market.

Tuticorin is known as "Gateway of Tamilnadu". Thoothukudi is the major chemical producer in the state. It produces the 70 percent of the total salt production in the state and 30 percent in the country.

IT/ITeS-Software
Tamil Nadu is one of the largest contributor of software exports majorly from its cities Chennai, Coimbatore, Trichy, Salem and Madurai  .  State has 526 engineering colleges, the most for any state in India giving the services industry access to qualified and skilled labour force. The top engineering colleges in Tamil Nadu have been a major recruiting hub for the IT firms. According to estimates, about 50 per cent of the human resources required for the IT and ITES industry was being sourced from the state. The state has a wide network of about 110 industrial parks and estates offering developed plots with supporting infrastructure. Also, the state government is promoting other industrial parks like Rubber Park, Apparel Parks, Floriculture Park, TIDEL Park for IT/ITS, TICEL BioPark for Biotechnology, Siruseri IT Park, Elcot SEZ and Agro Export Zones among others. Tamil Nadu has the largest number of Small and medium enterprises (SMEs) in India.

Automotive

Chennai is nicknamed "The Detroit of Asia". It is home to large number of auto component industries. Over 11.2% of the S&P CNX 500 conglomerates have corporate offices in Tamil Nadu. Tamil Nadu has manufacturing facilities from automobiles, railway coaches, battle-tanks, tractors, motorbikes and heavy vehicles to ships.

Alstom has a manufacturing facility in Coimbatore which manufactures rail transportation products.

Vehicle parts manufacturers
Madras Rubber Factory the local tyre manufacturer is located in Chennai and Perambalur. TI cycles of Murugappa group have their units in Chennai. UCAL Carburettors, TRW Rane, TVS Group are established in Hosur.TVS Srichakra Tyre works at Madurai. Coimbatore is home to Pricol, Elgi Equipments, Craftsman, Roots Horn, Rolon Chains and numerous Tier-I part suppliers.

Transportation industry
Custom built trucks operated in Tamil Nadu, Kerala and Karnataka are from Tiruchengode, Sankagiri, and Namakkal. 90 Percent of Private busses operating in South India are built in Karur. Karur is well known for its bus body building industries. More than 150 Bus body building industries are located in and around Karur. Apart from that, mostly all the TNSTC, MTC, SETC and PRTC busses are built in Karur.

Textiles and Apparels

Tamil Nadu is the largest textile hub of India. Tiruppur "Dollar City" due to its cotton production and textile industries. The textile industry plays a significant role in the Indian economy by providing direct employment to an estimated 35 million people, and thereby contributing 4% of GDP and 35% of gross export earnings. The textile sector contributes to 14% of the manufacturing sector. From Spinning to garment manufacturing, entire textile production chain facilities are in Tamil Nadu. About half of India's total spinning mill capacity is in Tamil Nadu. The western part of Tamil Nadu comprising Coimbatore, Tirupur, Erode, Namakkal, Karur and Dindigul has the majority of spinning mills manufacturing cotton/polyester/blended yarn, open end yarn and silk yarn used by garment units in Tamil Nadu, Maharastra etc. Yarn is also exported to China, Bangladesh etc. Tirupur knitted garment units have been exporting garments for about 3 decades with 2015–16 exports in the range of US$3 Billion. Karur is the major home textile (Curtain cloth, bed linens, kitchen linens, toilet linens, table linens, wall hangings etc.) manufacturing and export hub in India. Erode is the main cloth market in south India for both retail and wholesale ready-mades. Madras (Chennai) has a large presence of woven garments (shirts/pants) manufacturing units.  Madurai and Kanchipuram are famous for handloom sarees exported / sold all over India. Lakshmi Machine Works [LMW], one of the three major textile machinery manufacturing companies in the world is located in Coimbatore. Savio also has a factory in Coimbatore. Many textile component manufacturers are in Coimbatore and some export to the Europe etc.

Aerospace and defence

The defence industry in Tamil Nadu is one of the fastest growing sector in the states generating a huge amount of export revenue. The states serves as the headquarters for numerous defence manufacturing public undertakings such as Heavy Vehicles Factory, Combat Vehicles Research and Development Establishment, Ordnance Factory Tiruchirappalli, L&T Aerospace & Defence unit Coimbatore, LMW Advanced Technology Centre Coimbatore, Ashok Leyland Defence Systems, Mahindra Aerospace, Ramco Systems, TANEJA Aerospace and Salem Aerospace Limited. The state has the country's first defence corridor and aerospace park. The principal cities manufacturing defence and aerospace components are Chennai, Coimbatore, Tiruchirappalli, Salem and the secondary manufacturing cities are Nagercoil and Hosur. French aerospace and defence company, Airbus decided to invest 1 billion dollar (7,200 crores) in an aerospace project in Chennai. The company has also planned to built a helicopter assembly factory in Tamil Nadu. Tier - II cities of Coimbatore and Salem also serves as a major export hub for defence manufacturing firms. Defence, paramilitary and police personnel across the nation use guns, ammunitions and bullets manufactured from the city.
Special grade steel used in making missiles are manufactured in Salem. India's multinational engineering conglomerate L&T joint venture with France-based MBDA, a world leader in missile systems planned a "L&T MBDA Missile Systems" facility at Aspen SEZ in Coimbatore serves as its hub to export fully assembled missile systems to Europe.

Tamil Nadu also is the hub station where the first Indian made Fifth-generation jet fighter plane is to be manufactured. The Aeronautical Development Agency, which conceived and designed the Light Combat Aircraft (LCA) Tejas, set the ball rolling for building the next generation defence aircraft, the Advanced Medium Combat Aircraft (AMCA), by initiating in Coimbatore to build a technology demonstrator.
The project – to be implemented in Sulur in Coimbatore district which will house the permanent base of the Tejas squadron – marks one of Tamil Nadu's first major defence aircraft project.

Electronics
Electronics manufacturing is a growing industry in Tamil Nadu. Chennai has emerged as EMS Hub of India. Companies like Flextronics, Motorola, Sony-Ericsson, Foxconn, Samsung, Cisco, and Dell have chosen Chennai as their South Asian manufacturing hub. Products manufactured include circuit boards and cellular phone handsets. Ericsson also has a Research and Development facility in Chennai. Big EPC companies have set up their Engineering centres which include Saipem India Projects Ltd, Technip, Foster Wheeler, Schneider Electric, Mott MacDonald, Petrofac, Austrian company "Austrian Energy and Environment" have also a design office here besides local giant ECC Larsen & Toubro. Sanmina-SCI is the latest company to invest in Tamil Nadu to create a state of the art manufacturing facility. Nokia Siemens Networks has decided to build a manufacturing plant for wireless network equipment in Tamil Nadu.

The state with a projected population of about 66.5 million in year 2009 has a high mobile market share in India. According to statistics released by Telecom Regulatory Authority of India (TRAI), the state had a total subscriber base of 43 million mobile customers at the beginning of August 2009.

Leather
Tamil Nadu accounts for 60 per cent of leather tanning capacity in India and 38 per cent of all leather footwear, garments and components. The state also accounts for 50 per cent of leather exports from India, valued at around US$3.3 billion of the total US$6.5 billion from India. Hundreds of leather and tannery facilities are located around Vellore and its nearby towns, such as Ranipet, Ambur and Vaniyambadi. The Vellore district is the top exporter of finished leather goods in the country. Vellore leather accounts for more than 37 percent of the country's export of leather and leather-related products (such as finished leathers, shoes, garments and gloves).

Hundreds of leather and tannery industries are located around Vellore, Dindigul and Erode its nearby towns such as Ranipet, Ambur, Perundurai and Vaniyambadi The tanning industry in India has a total capacity of 225 million pieces of hides and skins, of which Tamil Nadu alone contributes 70 per cent, a leading export product share at 40 per cent for India. It currently employs about 2.5 million persons. Leather exports by the end of 2000–2001 were INR90 billion.

Central Leather Research Institute, a CSIR research laboratory, is located in Chennai, the state capital.

Fireworks
The city of Sivakasi is a leader in the areas of printing, fireworks, and safety matches. It was fondly called as "Little Japan" by Jawaharlal Nehru. It contributes to 90% of India's fireworks production. Over 2,345 licensed fireworks factories are present around sivakasi city and around 2,34,000 people's are working.Sivakasi provides over 60% of India's total offset printing solutions. Only after Gutenberg in Germany, Sivakasi has more number of printing presses in the world.

Banking
The first modern bank in Tamil Nadu, Bank of Madras was started by the British in 1843. It was followed by the opening of other banks namely – Arbuthnot & Co, Bank of Chettinad, Bank of Madura, that were later merged under the supervision of RBI. The state serves as the headquarters for the second most banks in India, only next to the financial Capital Mumbai. The banking sector in Tamil Nadu is broadly classified into scheduled banks and non-scheduled banks. All banks included in the Second Schedule to the Reserve Bank of India Act, 1934 are Scheduled Banks. These banks comprise Scheduled Commercial Banks and Scheduled Co-operative Banks. Scheduled Co-operative Banks consist of Scheduled State Co-operative Banks and Scheduled Urban Cooperative Banks. Scheduled Commercial Banks in Tamil Nadu are categorised into five different groups according to their ownership and/or nature of operation:
 Nationalised Banks
 Private Sector Banks
 Foreign Banks
 Regional Rural Banks
 Small Finance Banks
The following are the list of Banks based in Tamil Nadu.

Transportation

Tamil Nadu has a well established transportation system that connects all parts of the state. This is partly responsible for the investment in the state. Though the present transportation system is substantial, it needs to be developed further to keep pace with the rapid increase in use. Tamil Nadu is served by an extensive road network in terms of its spread and quality, providing links between urban centres, agricultural market-places and rural habitations in the countryside.

Road

The state is also a terminus for North-South Corridor Road (NH44) and the Golden Quadrilateral project that is 99.2% completed as of 31 July 2010. Chennai Mofussil Bus Terminus is the largest bus terminal in Tamil Nadu. The state has a total road length of 167,000 km, of which 60,628 km are maintained by Highways Department. This is nearly 2.5 times higher than the density of all-India road network. It ranks second with a share of over 20% in total road projects under operation in the public-private partnership model. It is currently working on upgrading its road network, though the pace of work is considered slow.

Railway

Tamil Nadu has a well-developed rail network as part of Southern Railway. Headquartered at Chennai, the present Southern Railway network extends over a large area of India's Southern Peninsula, covering the states of Tamil Nadu, Kerala, Puducherry, minor portions of Karnataka and Andhra Pradesh. Tamil Nadu has a total railway track length of 6,693 km and there are 690 railway stations in the state. The system connects it with most major cities in India. Main rail junctions in the state include Chennai, Coimbatore, Erode, Dindigul, Katpadi, Thanjavur, Madurai, Salem and Tirunelveli. Chennai has a well-established Suburban Railway network, a Mass Rapid Transport System and is currently developing a Metro system, with its first underground stretch operational since May 2017. Rapid Transit (Metro) or Light Metro  system in Coimbatore, Madurai and Tiruchirappalli are currently in under process 

Air

Tamil Nadu has a major international airport, Chennai International Airport, that is connected with 27 countries with more than 500 direct flights every day. Other international airports in Tamil Nadu include Coimbatore International Airport, Tiruchirappalli International Airport and Madurai Airport. Chennai International Airport is currently the fourth largest international airport in India after Delhi, Mumbai, and Bangalore has a passenger growth of 18%. It also has domestic airports at Salem, Thoothukudi making several parts of the state easily accessible. Increased industrial activity has given rise to an increase in passenger traffic as well as freight movement which has been growing at over 21.3 per cent per year.

Ports

Tamil Nadu has four major ports at Chennai, Ennore, Kattupalli and Tuticorin, as well as one intermediate port, Nagapattinam, and seven minor ports, Rameswaram, Kanyakumari, Cuddalore, Colachel, Karaikal, Pamban and Valinokkam of which are currently capable of handling over 73 million metric tonnes of cargo annually (24 per cent share of India). All the minor ports are managed by the Tamil Nadu Maritime Board. Chennai Port is an artificial harbour situated on the Coromandel Coast in South-East India and it is the second principal port in the country for handling containers. It is currently being upgraded to have a dedicated terminal for cars capable of handling 400,000 vehicles by 2009 to be used by Hyundai, Ford and Nissan Renault. Ennore Port was recently converted from an intermediate port to a major port and handles all the coal and ore traffic in Tamil Nadu. The volume of cargo in the ports grew by 13 per cent over 2005. The Tuticorin Port is expanding its facilities at the cost of US$1.6 billion. The Sethusamudram Shipping Canal Project will transform the Tuticorin port into a transshipment hub similar to those in Singapore and Colombo. The ports are in need of improvement and some of them have container terminals privatised.

Tourism 

Owing to the ancientness and depth of its civilization, Tamil Nadu has been a hub for tourism. In recent years, the state has emerged as one of the leading tourist destination for both domestic and foreign tourists. Tourism in Tamil Nadu is promoted by Tamil Nadu Tourism Development Corporation (TTDC), a Government of Tamil Nadu undertaking.  The state currently ranks the highest among Indian states with about 248 million arrivals in 2013. The annual growth rate of the industry stood at 16 per cent.  Approximately 2,804,687 foreign and 111,637,104 domestic tourists visited the state in 2010.

The state boasts some of the grand Hindu temples built in Dravidian architecture. The Brihadishwara Temple in Thanjavur, built by the Cholas, the Airavateswara temple in Darasuram and the Shore Temple, along with the collection of other monuments in Mahabalipuram (also called Mamallapuram) have been declared as UNESCO World Heritage Sites. Madurai is home to the Madurai Meenakshi Amman Temple. Sri Ranganathaswamy Temple, Srirangam is the largest functioning temple in the world, Tiruchirappalli where the famous Rockfort Temple is located, Rameshwaram whose temple walk-ways corridor (Praagarams) are the longest 1.2 km (0.75 mi) of all Indian temples in the world, Kanchipuram and Palani are important pilgrimage sites for Hindus. Other popular temples in Tamil Nadu include those in Gangaikonda Cholapuram, Chidambaram, Thiruvannaamalai, Tiruchendur, Tiruvarur, Kumbakonam, Srivilliputhur, Tiruttani, Namakkal, Vellore, Karur, Bhavani, Coimbatore, Kanniyakumari.

Tamil Nadu is also home to hill stations like Udhagamandalam (Ooty), Kodaikanal, Yercaud, Coonoor, Topslip, Valparai, Yelagiri and Manjolai. The Nilgiri hills, Palani hills, Shevaroy hills, Kolli Hills and Cardamom hills are all abodes of thick forests and wildlife. Tamil Nadu has many National Parks, Biosphere Reserves, Wildlife Sanctuaries, Elephant and Bird Sanctuaries, Reserved Forests, Zoos and Crocodile farms. Prominent among them are Mudumalai National Park, The Gulf of Mannar Biosphere Reserve, Anaimalai Wildlife Sanctuary, Vedanthangal Bird Sanctuary and Arignar Anna Zoological Park. The mangrove forests at Pichavaram are also eco-tourism spots of importance.

Kanyakumari, the southernmost tip of peninsular India, is famous for its beautiful sunrise, Vivekananda Rock Memorial and Thiruvalluvar's statue built off the coastline. Marina Beach in Chennai is one of the longest beaches in the world. The stretch of beaches from Chennai to Mahabalipuram are home to many resorts, theme parks and eateries. The prominent waterfalls in the state are Courtallam, Hogenakkal, Papanasam, Manimuthar, Thirparappu, Pykara and Silver Cascade. The Chettinad region of the state is renowned for its Palatial houses and cuisine. With medical care in Chennai, Vellore, Coimbatore and Madurai, Tamil Nadu has the largest numbers in Medical tourism in India.

Services

Tamil Nadu has 526 engineering colleges, the most for any state in India giving the services industry access to qualified and skilled labour force. The state has a wide network of about 110 industrial parks and estates offering developed plots with supporting infrastructure. Also, the state government is promoting other industrial parks like Rubber Park, Apparel Parks, Floriculture Park, TIDEL Park for IT/ITS, TICEL BioPark for Biotechnology, Siruseri IT Park, Elcot SEZ and Agro Export Zones among others. Tamil Nadu has the largest number of Small and medium enterprises (SMEs) in India.

This is a chart of trend of software exports from Tamil Nadu published by Electronics Corporation of Tamil Nadu with figures in Crores of Indian Rupees.

Chennai is the second largest software exporter in India, next only to Bangalore. India's largest IT park is housed at Chennai. Software exports from Tamil Nadu during 2017–2018 rose 8.6% per cent to touch 1,11,179 crore, involving a workforce of 780,000. Chennai is the largest hub for e-publishing, as there are 67 e-publishing units registered with the STPI in Chennai and 25 in Bangalore. Companies such as HCL Technologies, NTT DATA, Wipro, Tata Consultancy Services, Capgemini, Amazon.com, LTI, Tech Mahindra, Infosys, IBM, Cognizant, Accenture, Sopra Steria, CGI Inc., Verizon, DXC Technology, Atos, Virtusa and many others have offices in Chennai. India's largest IT park – SIPCOT is housed at Siruseri – Chennai, It has numerous IT companies such as TCS, CTS, Syntel, Steria, Polaris, Patni, Hexaware etc. Chennai has been rated as the most attractive city for offshoring services. Coimbatore is second largest Software exporter in Tamil Nadu with presence of Amazon.com, Bosch, Cognizant, Ford, NTT Data, TCS, Wipro, HCL, Capgemini, Harman, Deloitte. Cognizant has more than 13,000 employees working in Coimbatore, which is their second largest headcount in India after Chennai. Bosch has one of the largest R&D development centre in Coimbatore outside Germany which employees close to 5500 in the city. Madurai is the next biggest IT city. Companies like HCL, Honeywell are in Madurai. A new TIDEL park is proposed at Madurai Maatuthavani. The IT Companies like Capgemini, Sutherland, TTS Business Services, Sun Business Solution (Sun Group), Scientific Publishing, Omega Healthcare, Vagus Technologies, MMC Infotech are also in Tiruchirappalli.

Chennai has emerged as the "SaaS Capital of India". The SaaS sector in/around Chennai generated US$1 Billion in revenue and employed about 10000 personnel in 2018.

Government revenues
Tamil Nadu ranks fourth nationwide of all state governments in tax revenue. (See: States of India by tax revenues.)
This is a chart of trend of tax revenues (including the shares from Union tax pool) extracted from the Consolidated Fund of the Government of Tamil Nadu with figures in millions of Indian Rupees. See also the Finance Commission of India report.
Tax revenues of local bodies are excluded.

This is a chart of trend of non-tax revenues and grants-in-aid extracted from the Consolidated Fund of the Government of Tamil Nadu with figures in millions of Indian Rupees. See also  and.  Non-tax revenues of local bodies are excluded.

TN Government debt
Amount in Crores

Gallery

Notes

Citation